Traffic is road users including pedestrians and vehicles using the public way for purposes of travel.

Traffic, Trafic or Traffik may also refer to:

Arts and entertainment

Film and television
Trafic (Traffic), a 1971 Italian-French comedy film 
Traffic (2000 film), an American crime drama film 
 Traffik, a 1989 British TV miniseries on which the 2000 film was based
 Traffic (miniseries), a 2004 American TV miniseries based on the 2000 film
Trafic (2004 film), a Romanian short film 
Traffic (2011 film), a Malayalam-language film
Traffic (2016 film), a Hindi remake 
Traffik (film), a 2018 American thriller film

Music
 Traffic (band), an English rock band
 Traffic (Traffic album), 1968
 Traffic (Estonian band)
 Traffic (ABC album), 2008
 Trafic (album), by Gaëtan Roussel, 2018
 "Traffic" (Stereophonics song), 1997
 "Traffic" (Tiësto song), 2003
"Traffic", a 2019 song by Thom Yorke from Anima
"Traffic", a 2019 song by Peppa Pig from My First Album

Other uses in arts and entertainment
 Traffic (art exhibition), 1996

Ships
 Renault Trafic, a light commercial van
 , a baggage tender of the White Star Line
 , a ship's tender of the White Star Line

Other uses
 Internet traffic, the flow of data around the Internet
 Network traffic, the flow of data around a network
 Web traffic, the amount of data sent and received by visitors to a web site
 Traffic (broadcasting), the scheduling of program material
 Traffic (conservation programme) or TRAFFIC, a non-governmental organisation 
 Traffic Group, a sports event management company
 Traffic (journal), a scientific journal about signal transduction in health and disease
 Trafic (journal), a French arts and letters journal
 Traffic analysis

See also